"Yalla Chant" is a world music song performed by Belgian singer Natacha Atlas. The song was written by Atlas, Count Dubulah, Hamid ManTu and Attiah Ahlan and produced by Transglobal Underground for the Atlas' debut album Diaspora (1995). It was released as a single in 1995.

Formats and track listings
These are the formats and track listings of major single releases of "Yalla Chant".

CD single
(NAT60CD)
 "Yalla Chant" (Sil Bachir Radio mix) – 4:24
 "Yalla Chant" (The Lesson Four edit) – 4:37
 "Yalla Chant" (She a Baad Gal edit) – 4:26
 "Yalla Chant" (Latvian Shade) – 5:26
 "Yalla Chant" (Sil Bachir mix) – 6:09
 "Yalla Chant" (The Lesson Four mix) – 6:20

12-inch single
(NR60T)
 "Yalla Chant" (Latvian Shade) – 5:26
 "Yalla Chant" (Sil Bachir Radio mix) – 4:24
 "Yalla Chant" (The Lesson Four edit) – 4:37
 "Yalla Chant" (She a Baad Gal edit) – 4:26

Personnel
The following people contributed to "Yalla Chant":

Natacha Atlas – lead vocals
Neil Sparkes – goblet drum 
Alex Kasiek – melodica, strings
Walid Rouissi – oud
Count Dubulah – bass guitar
Acker Dolphy – midi bombard
Hamid Mantu – multiple instruments

References

External links
Official website
NatachaAtlas.net – authorized fan site

1995 singles
Arabic-language songs
Electronic songs
Natacha Atlas songs
1995 songs
Songs written by Natacha Atlas